The Clausius–Clapeyron relation, named after Rudolf Clausius and Benoît Paul Émile Clapeyron, specifies the temperature dependence of pressure, most importantly vapor pressure, at a discontinuous phase transition between two phases of matter of a single constituent. Its relevance to meteorology and climatology is the increase of the water-holding capacity of the atmosphere by about 7% for every 1 °C (1.8 °F) rise in temperature.

Definition

Exact Clapeyron equation
On a pressure–temperature (P–T) diagram, for any phase change the line separating the two phases is known as the coexistence curve. The Clapeyron relation gives the slope of the tangents to this curve. Mathematically,

 

Clausius–Clapeyron equation
The Clausius–Clapeyron equation applies to vaporization of liquids where vapor follows ideal gas law and liquid volume is neglected as being much smaller than vapor volume V. It is often used to calculate vapor pressure of a liquid.

 

 

The equation expresses this in a more convenient form just in terms of the latent heat, for moderate temperatures and pressures.

Derivations

Derivation from state postulate 
Using the state postulate, take the specific entropy  for a homogeneous substance to be a function of specific volume  and temperature .

 

The Clausius–Clapeyron relation characterizes behavior of a closed system during a phase change at constant temperature and pressure. Therefore,

 

Using the appropriate Maxwell relation gives

 

where  is the pressure. Since pressure and temperature are constant, the derivative of pressure with respect to temperature does not change. Therefore, the partial derivative of specific entropy may be changed into a total derivative

and the total derivative of pressure with respect to temperature may be factored out when integrating from an initial phase  to a final phase , to obtain

 

Given that a phase change is an internally reversible process, and that our system is closed, the first law of thermodynamics holds:

 

where  is the internal energy of the system. Given constant pressure and temperature (during a phase change) and the definition of specific enthalpy , we obtain

 

 

 

Given constant pressure and temperature (during a phase change), we obtain

 

Substituting the definition of specific latent heat  gives

 

Substituting this result into the pressure derivative given above, we obtain

 

This result (also known as the Clapeyron equation) equates the slope  of the coexistence curve  to the function  of the specific latent heat , the temperature , and the change in specific volume . Instead of the specific, corresponding molar values may also be used.

Derivation from Gibbs–Duhem relation 

Their chemical potentials are related by

 

Furthermore, along the coexistence curve,

 

One may therefore use the Gibbs–Duhem relation

 

 

Rearrangement gives

 

from which the derivation of the Clapeyron equation continues as in the previous section.

Ideal gas approximation at low temperatures

When the phase transition of a substance is between a gas phase and a condensed phase (liquid or solid), and occurs at temperatures much lower than the critical temperature of that substance, the specific volume of the gas phase  greatly exceeds that of the condensed phase . Therefore, one may approximate

 

at low temperatures. If pressure is also low, the gas may be approximated by the ideal gas law, so that

 

Substituting into the Clapeyron equation

 

we can obtain the Clausius–Clapeyron equation

 

for low temperatures and pressures, where  is the specific latent heat of the substance. Instead of the specific, corresponding molar values (i.e.  in kJ/mol and  = 8.31 J/(mol⋅K)) may also be used.

In general,  varies between any two such points, as a function of temperature. But if  is approximated as constant,

 

 

 

or

 

These last equations are useful because they relate equilibrium or saturation vapor pressure and temperature to the latent heat of the phase change without requiring specific-volume data. For instance, for water near its normal boiling point, with a molar enthalpy of vaporization of 40.7 kJ/mol and  = 8.31 J/(mol⋅K),

 .

Clapeyron's derivation
In the original work by Clapeyron, the following argument is advanced.
Clapeyron considered a Carnot process of saturated water vapor with horizontal isobars. As the pressure is a function of temperature alone, the isobars are also isotherms. If the process involves an infinitesimal amount of water, and an infinitesimal difference in temperature , the heat absorbed is
 
and the corresponding work is 
 
The ratio  is the efficiency of the Carnot engine, . Substituting and rearranging gives 
 
where lowercase  denotes the change in specific volume during the transition.

Applications

Chemistry and chemical engineering
For transitions between a gas and a condensed phase with the approximations described above, the expression may be rewritten as

 

For a liquid–gas transition,  is the specific latent heat (or specific enthalpy) of vaporization; for a solid–gas transition,  is the specific latent heat of sublimation. If the latent heat is known, then knowledge of one point on the coexistence curve, for instance (1 bar, 373 K) for water, determines the rest of the curve.

Meteorology and climatology
Atmospheric water vapor drives many important meteorologic phenomena (notably, precipitation), motivating interest in its dynamics. The Clausius–Clapeyron equation for water vapor under typical atmospheric conditions (near standard temperature and pressure) is

 

where

  is saturation vapor pressure,
  is temperature,
  is the specific latent heat of evaporation of water,
  is the gas constant of water vapor.

The temperature dependence of the latent heat  (and of the saturation vapor pressure ) cannot be neglected in this application. Fortunately, the August–Roche–Magnus formula provides a very good approximation:

  

This is also sometimes called the Magnus or Magnus–Tetens approximation, though this attribution is historically inaccurate. But see also the discussion of the accuracy of different approximating formulae for saturation vapour pressure of water.

Therefore, the August–Roche–Magnus equation implies that saturation water vapor pressure changes approximately exponentially with temperature under typical atmospheric conditions, and hence the water-holding capacity of the atmosphere increases by about 7% for every 1 °C rise in temperature.

Example 
One of the uses of this equation is to determine if a phase transition will occur in a given situation. We can assume

 

and substituting in

  (latent heat of fusion for water),
  K (absolute temperature),
  (change in specific volume from solid to liquid),

we obtain

 

To provide a rough example of how much pressure this is, to melt ice at −7 °C (the temperature many ice skating rinks are set at) would require balancing a small car (mass ~ 1000 kg) on a thimble (area ~ 1 cm2).

Second derivative 
While the Clausius–Clapeyron relation gives the slope of the coexistence curve, it does not provide any information about its curvature or second derivative. The second derivative of the coexistence curve of phases 1 and 2 is given by
 

See also
Van 't Hoff equation
Antoine equation
Lee–Kesler method

References

Bibliography

Notes

Thermodynamic equations
Atmospheric thermodynamics
Engineering thermodynamics